The 1897 FA Cup final was contested by Aston Villa and Everton at Crystal Palace. Aston Villa won 3–2, with goals by John Campbell, Fred Wheldon and Jimmy Crabtree. Everton's goals came from Jack Bell and Dickie Boyle.

With results elsewhere going their way, Villa confirmed their status as League champions on this day. This makes them the only team to date to achieve the league and cup "double" on the same day.

Match details

References

External links
Line-ups
Match report at www.fa-cupfinals.co.uk

1897
1896–97 in English football
Fa Cup Final 1897
Fa Cup Final 1897
FA Cup Final
FA Cup Final